Wang Yupu (October 1956 – 8 December 2020) was a Chinese politician and businessman, and a chairman of Sinopec, the world's second-biggest oil refiner.

Biography 
Wang was born in Xinmin, Liaoning, and began his career in the Daqing Oil Field. In September 2017, Wang was appointed as the Director of the State Administration of Work Safety. He was appointed as the first Minister of Emergency Management in March 2018.

Wang died of disease at age 64 on 8 December 2020.

References 

1956 births
2020 deaths
Businesspeople in the oil industry
Businesspeople from Shenyang
Members of the 19th Central Committee of the Chinese Communist Party
Members of the 18th Central Committee of the Chinese Communist Party
Alternate members of the 17th Central Committee of the Chinese Communist Party
Politicians from Shenyang
People's Republic of China politicians from Liaoning
Chinese Communist Party politicians from Liaoning
Members of the Chinese Academy of Engineering
Government ministers of the People's Republic of China
Petroleum engineers
Engineers from Liaoning